The Mahdi Servants Union, previously Khoddam Al-Mahdi Organization is a Twelver Shia religious group based in London, England, led by Kuwaiti cleric Yasser Al-Habib.

Positions 
The group's leader Yasser Al-Habib is considered to be at "radical right-wing" of Kuwaiti spectrum. He is hostile towards the Government of the Islamic Republic of Iran and has questioned the religious credentials of Ali Khamenei, Iran's Supreme Leader. Al-Habib has also denounced Lebanese Mohammad Hussein Fadlallah as a "mubtadi (innovator [in religion])". Among the few Shia figures the group approves is Sadiq al-Shirazi. Al-Habib had studied under Mohammed Ridha al-Shirazi while he was in Qom and is son-in-law of Mujtaba al-Shirazi. He is thus regarded a partisan of al-Shirazi network (shiraziyyin) in Europe. Members of the group follow Sadiq al-Shirazi as their Marja' (religious source of emulation).

The group has been called anti-Sunni, as it advocates for insulting Umar and Aishah, a companion and a wife of the Prophet. This, however, is a known shi'ite belief

Activities 
The group operates a satellite television named Fadak.

In 2013, they purchased the site of a former church for £1.2 million and founded Al-Muhassin Mosque in Fulmer, Buckinghamshire.

On 10 March 2018, four members of the group climbed on to a first-floor balcony of the Embassy of Iran, London, replacing the flag of Iran with that of their own group, in protest to arrest of Hussein al-Shirazi. They were arrested by the Metropolitan Police.

The group was behind production of the feature film The Lady of Heaven (2021), with a reported budget of $15 million.

On 4 August 2022, members of this group carrying religious banners and flags protested at the Embassy of Azerbaijan in London. Members of the organization climbed on the balcony with the ladder, replaced flag of Azerbaijan with their own flag, and shouted religious slogans. After this event, British police arrested eight organization members.

Legal character 
Khodam Al Mahdi Organisation (KMO) was founded on 23 February 2010 and subsequently registered as a charity by the Charity Commission for England and Wales on 21 July 2010. It was co-directed by four people, namely Adel Salah, Ali Shubber, Mohamed Salah and Yassir Fowjian, all British citizens. The charity was legally dissolved on 10 April 2012 at the Companies House but remained active afterwards, continuing to raised money in the charity's name and buying a property. After Charity Commission became aware of this, it launched a statutory inquiry into the organization and on 7 April 2014 removed KMO from the list. During its three years of legal existence from 2010 to 2012, the KMO had all filed financial documents declaring that its income and expenditure were both exactly £25,000.

On 8 November 2017, a private company limited by shares named Khoddam Al Mahdi Organisation Ltd. was incorporated. The dormant company was wholly owned by Thamer Jundi Jassam, a Swedish citizen, who also served as its director. It was officially dissolved on 16 April 2019 via compulsory strike-off.

References

External links
 

Islamic organizations established in 2004
Islamic organisations based in the United Kingdom
Shia organizations
Religious organisations based in London
Anti-Sunnism